Offenses under United States federal law are grouped into different classes according to the maximum term of imprisonment defined within the statute for the offense. The classes of offenses under United States federal law are as follows:

See also
Special assessment on convicted persons
Supervised release
Probation and supervised release under United States federal law

References

United States federal criminal law